Phosphorus heptabromide is an inorganic compound with the formula PBr7. It is one of the phosphorus bromides. At normal conditions, it forms red prismatic crystals. PBr7 can be prepared by the sublimation of a mixture of phosphorus pentabromide and bromine.

PBr5 + Br2 → PBr7

The structure consists of a PBr4+ cation paired with a tribromide (Br3–) anion, and the tribromide is non-symmetric.

See also 
 Phosphorus tribromide
 Phosphorus pentabromide

References 

Phosphorus bromides
Polyhalides
Phosphonium compounds